Charles or Charlie Watts may refer to:

Sportsmen
Charlie Watts (footballer) (1870–1924), English goalkeeper
Charles Watts (cricketer, born 1894) (1894–1979), English right-handed batsman
Charles Watts (cricketer, born 1905) (1905–1985), English wicket-keeper
Charlie Watts (baseball), American Negro league second baseman

Writers
Charles Watts (secularist) (1836–1906), English writer, publisher and secularist
Charles Albert Watts (1858–1946), English editor, publisher and secularist; son of above
Charlie Watts (fascist) (1903–1971), English memoirist and member of British Union of Fascists
Charles DeWitt Watts (1917–2004), African American surgeon, activist and memoirist
Charles Henry Watts II (1926–2001), American academic author and president of Bucknell University

Others
Charles Watts (before 1650—after 1682), English apothecary who apprenticed James Sherard
Charles Christopher Watts (1877–1958), English Anglican bishop
Charles Watts (before 1890—after 1937), American defense attorney for Scottsboro Boys
Charles Cameron Watts (1895–1965), Australian Congregationalist minister, a/k/a C. C. Watts
Charles Watts (1912–1966), American character actor in 1965's Baby the Rain Must Fall 
Charlie Watts (1941–2021), English rock drummer with The Rolling Stones
Charlie Watts, American 1996 Democratic nominee for Georgia's 7th district (Electoral history of Bob Barr)

See also
Charles Watts Memorial Library, Canadian collective at The Kootenay School of Writing (KSW)